Schott may refer to:

 Schott (surname)
 Schott Dscherid Salt Plain near Nafta, Tunisia
 Schott AG, a German glass products manufacturer
 Schott frères, a Belgium music publisher, now part of Schott Music
 Schott Music, a German music publisher
 Schott NYC, a New York clothing company
 The Jerome Schottenstein Center ("Schott"), a multi-purpose arena in Columbus, Ohio, United States
 5312 Schott (1981 VP2), a main-belt asteroid

See also
Shott (disambiguation)